Marko Mitrović may refer to:

 Marko Mitrović (footballer, born 1978), Serbian football coach and former player
 Marko Mitrović (footballer, born 1992), Swedish footballer